The 28th Connecticut Infantry Regiment was an infantry regiment that served in the Union Army during the American Civil War for nine months service.

Service
The 28th Connecticut Infantry Regiment was organized at New Haven, Connecticut, on November 15, 1862, under the command of Colonel Samuel P. Ferris.

The regiment was attached to 1st Brigade, 3rd Division, XIX Corps, Department of the Gulf, to July 1863. 2nd Brigade, 3rd Division, XIX Corps, to August 1863.

The 28th Connecticut Infantry mustered out of service August 28, 1863.

Detailed service
Left Connecticut for eastern New York November 17, then sailed for Ship Island, Mississippi and New Orleans, Louisiana, December 3, arriving there December 17. Duty at Camp Parapet, Carrollton, Louisiana, until February, and at Fort Barrancas, Florida, until May. Moved to Brashear City, Louisiana, May 10–12, then to Port Hudson, Louisiana, May 23–26. Siege of Port Hudson, May 26-July 9, 1863. Assaults on Port Hudson May 27 and June 14. Surrender of Port Hudson July 9. Duty at Port Hudson until August 7.

Casualties
The regiment lost a total of 113 men during service; 2 officers and 14 enlisted men killed or mortally wounded, 3 officers and 94 enlisted men died of disease.

Commanders
 Colonel Samuel P. Ferris

Notable members
 Private Nicholas Fox, Company H - Medal of Honor recipient for action during the Siege of Port Hudson, June 14, 1863

See also

 Connecticut in the American Civil War
 List of Connecticut Civil War units

References
 Dyer, Frederick H. A Compendium of the War of the Rebellion (Des Moines, IA: Dyer Pub. Co.), 1908.
 Hoyt, Noah Webster. The Civil War Diaries of Noah Webster Hoyt: 28th Regiment Connecticut Volunteers (Stamford, CT: Stamford Historical Society), 1996.  
 Roster of the Twenty-Eighth Regiment, Connecticut Volunteers, 1862-1897 (Winsted, CT: Dowd Print. Co.), 1897.
 Schofield, Loomis. History of the Twenty-Eighth Regiment Connecticut Volunteers (New Canaan, CT: New Canaan Advertiser), 1915.
Attribution
 

Military units and formations established in 1862
Military units and formations disestablished in 1863
28th Connecticut Infantry Regiment
1862 establishments in Connecticut